Edmond Farhat (20 May 1933 – 17 December 2016) was a Lebanese prelate of the Catholic Church who spent his career in the diplomatic service of the Holy See

Biography
Farhat was born in Ain Kfaa, Lebanon, on 20 May 1933. On 28 March 1959, the Maronite Patriarch of Antioch Paul Peter Meouchi ordained him a priest. He earned degrees in theology, philosophy and canon law in Paris and Rome and a doctorate in theology. 

From 1967 to 1989 he worked as undersecretary of the Synod of Bishops in Rome and from 1970 to 1989 as Professor of Islamic Law at the University of Sassari.

On 26 August 1989, Pope John Paul II appointed him Apostolic Delegate to Libya, Apostolic Pro-Nuncio to Tunisia and Algeria, and titular archbishop of Byblus. On 20 October 1989 Farhat was consecrated a bishop by Pope John Paul. His co-consecrators were Edward Cassidy and Francesco Colasuonno. On 26 July 1995, he was named Nuncio to Slovenia and Macedonia. 

He worked as mediator of diplomatic relations between the Sovereign Military Order of Malta and Macedonia, which thus the Order officially recognized. On 11 December 2001 he was named nuncio to Turkmenistan and Turkey. In Turkey his advocacy for Turkish membership in the European Union resulted in warnings that he was failing to comply with Turkish law limited the role of religion in civic affairs.

On 26 July 2005 he was appointed apostolic nuncio to Austria.

On 14 January 2009, Pope Benedict XVI accepted Farhat's resignation as Apostolic Nuncio to Austria.
On 22 December 2009, Pope Benedict named him a member of the Congregation for the Causes of Saints.

He died in Rome on 17 December 2016.

Honours
 Honorary conventual of the Sovereign Military Order of Malta
 Grand Officer of the Order of Merit of the Italian Republic (2008)
 Decoration of Honour for Services to the Republic of Austria (2009)

Works
 Gerusalemme nei documenti Pontifici from 1887 to 1984. Libreria Editrice Vaticana, Rome, 1987, .

References

1933 births
2016 deaths
Apostolic Nuncios to Tunisia
Apostolic Nuncios to Slovenia
Apostolic Nuncios to Libya
Apostolic Nuncios to North Macedonia
Apostolic Nuncios to Austria
Apostolic Nuncios to Turkey
20th-century Maronite Catholic bishops
21st-century Maronite Catholic bishops
Lebanese Roman Catholic bishops
20th-century Roman Catholic titular archbishops
Grand Officers of the Order of Merit of the Italian Republic
Apostolic Nuncios to Turkmenistan
Apostolic Nuncios to Algeria